Events from the year 1733 in Denmark.

Incumbents
 Monarch – Christian VI
 Prime minister – Iver Rosenkrantz

Events

Undated
 The introduction of the Stavnsbånd, a serfdom-like institution later abolished on 20 June 1798.

Births
8 October - Peter Holm, government official and topographical writer (d.1817)

Full date missing
 Frederik Bargum, nusinessman (died 1813)

Deaths

References

 
1730s in Denmark
Years of the 18th century in Denmark